Headstone Manor is a 14th-century Grade I listed moated manor house in Headstone, England, and today a part of the Headstone Manor and Museum. Headstone Manor & Museum is a museum of the site itself as well as Harrow more generally. It also hosts a programme of talks, tours, events and family activities for visitors. Headstone Manor & Museum is open Tuesday to Sunday, all year round. Entry to the site and the museum is free.

History of Headstone Manor House 
The land on which Headstone Manor stands is recorded to have belonged to Wulfred, Archbishop of Canterbury in 825 AD. It is located in Headstone, in the London Borough of Harrow.

Still in ecclesiastical ownership, the construction of the Manor House began around 1310, as revealed by dendochronological dating of the building's oldest timbers. Archbishop John Stratford purchased more land around the house in 1344 and used it as his main residence in Middlesex.

Headstone Manor remained the property of the Archbishops of Canterbury until the Reformation, when in 1546 it was surrendered to Henry VIII by Thomas Cranmer. Henry VIII was ‘Lord of the Manor of Headstone’ for six days, before selling the property to Edward North, a court favourite. During the 16th century it appears that parts of the manor were demolished and extended, including the great hall and the high end.

In 1631 the house belonged to Francis Rewse and family, who panelled part of the great hall and built a rear extension. The house was sold in 1649 to William Williams, who built a substantial new wing, including cellars, bedrooms and a pantry. In the 1770s another wing was built, and a brick façade. At some point in the 17th or 18th century, the building was converted to a farmhouse.

Headstone Manor eventually fell into a state of disrepair, and much of its surrounding land was sold off in the 19th & 20th centuries for the development that surrounds it today. In 1925. Hendon Rural District Council bought the site to create what is now Headstone Recreation Ground.

Following local government reorganisation in 1968 responsibility for Headstone Manor fell to the newly created London Borough of Harrow. After further years of increasing dilapidation, local people campaigned and volunteered to turn the site into a Museum for Harrow, which officially opened in 1986. Following a Heritage Lottery Funded regeneration of the site the Museum reopened in 2017.

Headstone Manor & Museum Site

The Headstone Manor & Museum site consists of four separate buildings with the museum being based in the Manor House itself. The site also includes a 14th-century complete and filled moat.

Headstone Manor House 
Built in around 1310, Headstone Manor is the earliest surviving timber-framed house in Middlesex. The fabric of this Grade I listed building contains work dating from the 14th, 17th and 18th centuries. Headstone Manor has been described as ‘one of the most interesting domestic complexes in the whole country’. The Manor House now contains the museum at Headstone Manor, telling the history of Harrow through the house and the people who have lived there over its history.

The Great Barn 

The Grade II 500-year-old Great Barn was used to store grain and livestock when Headstone Manor was a working farm. It was also the centre of local home front activities in the area during World War II as well as the first home of the museum in the 1980s. The Great Barn is now available to hire for functions and weddings as well as being used for community events. The Great Barn is only open on special event days and will not be open to the general public except on public event days. Although, whenever possible, Headstone Manor & Museum Guided Tours go inside the barn.

The Small Barn 

The Small Barn stands opposite The Great Barn and is also a Grade II listed building. It dates back to the Tudor period, when it would have been used to house livestock. It now houses the entrance to the museum, exploring the history of Harrow before The Manor House was built, as well as a short film introducing the site.

The Granary 

Dating from the early 19th Century, the Granary was originally constructed at Pinner Park Farm. The building was relocated to the Headstone Manor and Museum site in 1992. The Granary is now Headstone Manor & Museum's dedicated learning centre, a space for schools sessions, family & kids workshops, adult learning as well as Tuesday Talks. During school sessions, The Granary is not open to the public. When the building is not in use by a group, members of the public are free to enter and use the free art cart located on the ground floor of the building.

Additional facilities

The Moat Café and Visitor Centre 

Located near The Small Barn, The Moat Café and Visitor Centre is where freshly ground coffee, cakes, paninis and other hot snacks are available. The Visitor Centre also houses a gift shop, with a range of handcrafted pieces including jewellery, books and children's gifts. The Visitor Centre also contains a disabled toilet and baby changing facilities. The Moat café and visitor centre is open every day except Mondays.

Car Park 
There is a free car park in Pinner View, 100m from the entrance gate of Headstone Manor Museum.

Cycling 
There are several different bike racks by the car park and the Headstone Recreation entrances to the museum.

References

External links
 Headstone Manor & Museum

Buildings and structures completed in 1310
Houses completed in the 14th century
Timber framed buildings in England
Country houses in London
Grade I listed buildings in the London Borough of Harrow
Grade I listed houses in London
Grade I listed museum buildings
Houses in the London Borough of Harrow
History of the London Borough of Harrow
History of Middlesex
Middlesex